Kimberly Pate  (born November 10, 1959) is a Canadian politician who has served as a senator from Ontario since November 10, 2016, sitting with the Independent Senators Group (ISG) caucus. Pate was appointed on the advice of Prime Minister Justin Trudeau.

Background 
Pate graduated from Dalhousie Law School in 1984 with honours in the Clinical Law Programme and has completed post graduate work in the area of forensic mental health. In 2014, she was named a member of the Order of Canada for advocating on behalf of women who are marginalized, victimized or incarcerated, and for her research on women in the criminal justice system. Pate is a former executive director of the Canadian Association of Elizabeth Fry Societies. In 2011 she was a recipient of the Governor General's Award in Commemoration of the Persons Case.

On October 31, 2016, it was announced that Prime Minister Justin Trudeau would recommend that she be appointed to the Senate of Canada. She will sit as an independent. Pate assumed office on November 10, 2016.

Activity
In May 2022 together with two other senators Senator Anderson issued a report calling for a review of the convictions of 12 indigenous women, including the Quewezance sisters, and their exoneration.

She is out as lesbian, and is a member of the Canadian Pride Caucus, a non-partisan committee of Canada's LGBTQ MPs and senators.

References

External links
Kim Pate, Parliament of Canada website
Interview: Kim Pate, The Fifth Estate'', CBC News
Citation for Governor General's Award, 2011
New senator Kim Pate gives a voice to women in Canada's prisons Patrick White, The Globe and Mail, 2017 Jan.3

1959 births
Living people
Members of the Order of Canada
Canadian senators from Ontario
Independent Canadian senators
Women members of the Senate of Canada
21st-century Canadian politicians
21st-century Canadian women politicians
Independent Senators Group
Canadian LGBT senators
Lesbian politicians
21st-century Canadian LGBT people